T. Gopichand may refer to 

Tripuraneni Gopichand (1910 – 1962), Telugu writer and novelist
Tottempudi Gopichand (born 1979), Indian actor in Telugu films